John Bemelmans Marciano (born 1970) is an American children's book author and illustrator.

Life
The grandson of Ludwig Bemelmans, the creator of the children's book series Madeline, has continued the series with three books written and illustrated in his grandfather's style: Madeline and the Cats of Rome, Madeline at the White House and Madeline and the Old House in Paris. He grew up in Three Bridges, New Jersey, and graduated from Columbia University in 1992.

References

1970 births
Living people
American children's writers

Columbia College (New York) alumni